KOKA (980 AM) is an AM radio station, paired with an FM relay translator, licensed to Shreveport, Louisiana, and serving the Shreveport-Bossier City metropolitan area with an Urban contemporary gospel format. The station is currently under ownership of Alpha Media LLC, through licensee Alpha Media Licensee LLC. KOKA's studio is located just north of downtown Shreveport, and the transmitter is north of Cross Lake.

Former blues and gospel singer-songwriter Eddy Giles was a DJ at the station for 40 years. He was a gospel announcer, program director and music director.

References

External links

Gospel radio stations in the United States
Christian radio stations in Louisiana
Alpha Media radio stations